Nicolás Emiliano Yaqué (born 5 May 1993) is an Argentine professional footballer who plays as a forward. He is currently a free agent.

Club career
Yaqué began his senior career with Almagro. He made his debut in a Primera B Metropolitana loss to Villa Dálmine on 22 April 2014, on the way to a total of thirty-seven appearances in three campaigns. In 2015, Yaqué scored his first professional goal in a fixture with Comunicaciones on 7 November - in a season which culminated with promotion to Primera B Nacional, where he'd play twice before leaving the club. On 31 January 2017, Yaqué switched Argentina for Spain by joining San Pedro. A move to fellow Tercera División team Gavà followed, along with eight appearances. Tortosa of Primera Catalana, tier four, signed Yaqué in early 2018.

International career
In October 2015, Yaqué received a call-up to train with the Argentina U23s.

Personal life
Carlos Yaqué, a former professional footballer, is the father of Yaqué. Nahuel Yaqué is his brother, with the two footballers playing together for San Pedro, Gavà and Tortosa.

Career statistics
.

References

External links

1993 births
Living people
Yaqué family
Place of birth missing (living people)
Argentine footballers
Association football forwards
Argentine expatriate footballers
Expatriate footballers in Spain
Argentine expatriate sportspeople in Spain
Primera Nacional players
Tercera División players
Primera Catalana players
Club Almagro players
UD San Pedro players
CF Gavà players
CD Tortosa players